Return of the B-Izer is the third album by American rapper JT Money. It was released on September 24, 2002, was produced by Renard "Church Boi" Hughes and Natural, and engineered by Disco Rick and Hughes as well.

Track listing

Personnel

 Kevin Parker - Mixing
 Fred Reeves - Photography
 JT Money- Executive Producer
 Natural- Producer
 Damon Forbes - Executive Producer
 Renard "Church Boi" Hughes - Producer, Mixing Assistant, Engineer
 Disco Rick - Engineer, A&R

References

2002 albums
JT Money albums